Nihošovice is a municipality and village in Strakonice District in the South Bohemian Region of the Czech Republic. It has about 300 inhabitants.

Administrative parts
The village of Jetišov is an administrative part of Nihošovice and forms an exclave of the municipal territory.

Gallery

References

Villages in Strakonice District